The Xiangfu Bridge is a historic stone arch bridge over the Grand Canal in , Gongshu District, Hangzhou, Zhejiang, China. It is the only Ming dynasty stone arch bridge preserved in Hangzhou.

History
The first known instance of Xiangfu Bridge being documented on Lin'an Annals of Xianchun appeared in 1268, during the Southern Song dynasty. The current bridge was rebuilt in 1543, during the reign of Jiajing Emperor of the Ming dynasty (1368–1644).

On 6 May 2013, it was listed among the seventh batch of "Major National Historical and Cultural Sites in Zhejiang" by the State Council of China.

Gallery

References

Bridges in Zhejiang
Arch bridges in China
Bridges completed in 1543
Ming dynasty architecture
Buildings and structures completed in 1543
1543 establishments in China
Major National Historical and Cultural Sites in Zhejiang